The South River is a  tributary of the Maury River in the U.S. state of Virginia. It is part of the James River watershed.

It rises southwest of Lofton in Augusta County, Virginia, near the western base of the Blue Ridge Mountains, and quickly receives the Saint Marys River coming out of the mountains from the east. Entering Rockbridge County near the village of Vesuvius, the South River continues to flow southwest and joins the Maury River between Lexington and Buena Vista.

See also
List of rivers of Virginia

References

USGS Hydrologic Unit Map - State of Virginia (1974)

Rivers of Virginia
Tributaries of the James River
Rivers of Augusta County, Virginia
Rivers of Rockbridge County, Virginia